Sporting Club de Douai is a French football club based in Douai, which was founded in 1919. It competed in Ligue 2 from 1945 to 1949.

External links
 

Football clubs in France
Association football clubs established in 1919
1919 establishments in France
SC Douai
Football clubs in Hauts-de-France
Sport in Nord (French department)
Douai